NerdaCon was a multi-genre fan convention (first seen as a "gaming, popular arts, and crafts convention") held annually since 2007 at Columbus State University by the school's Campus Nerds group, a campus organization that describes itself as "an organization that embraces all special interests and gives its members a community of like minded individuals". Each year, the con was titled "NerdaCon vX", where "X" is the number of the con (The first was "v1", the second was "v2", etc.). As it was a multi-genre convention, it had no general focus other than that of the Nerds, in that the panels, guests, and dealers each added a focus toward anime, manga, science fiction, gaming, comic books, zombie apocalypse, or a combination of these or other generally nerdy or geeky things to add to the atmosphere. NerdaCon was a free event to the general public until NerdaCon v9, in which it switched to a paid admission system in order to support its move from Columbus State University to the Columbus Convention and Trade Center in 2015, where it had been for NerdaCon v10 and v11. NerdaCon helped support organizations such as Children's Miracle Network and the Hero Initiative through donations.

By tradition, the convention was held on a Friday and Saturday in November, from 6:00 PM to 11:00 PM on the Friday, and 10:00 AM to 11:00 PM on the Saturday. However, since NerdaCon v6 was held on November 11, 2011 (11/11/11), each day was extended by 11 minutes, making it end at 11:11 PM.

Events
NerdaCon held many events throughout the span of the convention, including boffer, trading card, and video game tournaments (and casual play), a costume contest to judge the best Cosplay, and the Saturday night dance with music from guest DJs. NerdaCon also offered a vendor hall with many vendors and artists selling goods, multiple panel rooms hosting a variety of topics, an anime viewing room, and a variety of special guests.

Event History

References

External links
The official NerdaCon website
The official Campus Nerds website

Defunct multigenre conventions
Recurring events established in 2007
Recurring events disestablished in 2016
Tourist attractions in Columbus, Georgia
Conventions in Georgia (U.S. state)